Nancy Grace is an American current affairs program hosted by legal commentator Nancy Grace that aired Monday through Thursday nights between February 2, 2005 and October 13, 2016, on HLN. On June 30, 2016, Nancy Grace announced she would be leaving HLN in October, and the final episode aired on October 13, when her contract ended. The show was replaced with Primetime Justice with Ashleigh Banfield, which premiered on October 17.

Controversies

Grace's comments on the show have garnered significant controversy, most significantly involving the Duke lacrosse case, the suicide of interviewee Melinda Duckett, and the death of Caylee Anthony.

Guest hosts
When Grace was absent from the show (for family reasons, or during her run on cycle 13 of Dancing with the Stars for training, for instance), other CNN hosts substituted for her. Usually the substitute was In Session anchor Jean Casarez, Jane Velez-Mitchell, or Inside Edition correspondent Rita Cosby, although Sam Champion from Good Morning America and Pat Lalama also hosted the program.

See also
 Jane Velez-Mitchell (TV program)

References

External links

2000s American television news shows
2010s American television news shows
2005 American television series debuts
2016 American television series endings
CNN Headline News original programming